Christian Stolte (born October 16, 1962) is an American character actor. He portrayed corrections officer Keith Stolte on the TV series Prison Break and Charles Makley in the film Public Enemies.  He starred as chief appraiser David Kim Parker in The Onions web series Lake Dredge Appraisal.  He also portrayed Clarence Darby in the film Law Abiding Citizen. Stolte's acting career also includes voice over work (or voice acting) with Breathe Bible.  Since 2012 he has portrayed Randy McHolland (Mouch) in the NBC series Chicago Fire and other shows in the Chicago franchise.

Filmography

References

External links
 

1961 births
American male television actors
Living people
Male actors from St. Louis